John Percival Droop (4 October 1882 – 26 September 1963, in Vence, France) was a British classical archaeologist of Dutch descent. 

After attending Marlborough College and Trinity College, Cambridge, Droop became a student of the British School at Athens, where he excavated at Sparta, in Thessaly, on Milos and on Crete. He later became a full member of the BSA.

In 1911, Droop joined T. Eric Peet's Egypt Exploration Fund at Abydos, where he and Peet developed a system for dating pre-dynastic Egyptian ceramics. During the First World War, Droop worked for the Admiralty, and remained in post until 1921, when he was appointed the Charles W. Jones Professor of Classical Archaeology in the University of Liverpool, a position he held until 1948. 

He excavated widely: at Chester, Bainbridge and Lancaster in Britain, and at Niebla in Spain. He edited the scholarly journal Annals of Archaeology and Anthropology from 1937 until 1948.

Droop gives his name to an Ancient Greek bowl form, dating from the 5th century BC, which he studied and categorised. Droop also researched the temple of Artemis Orthia at Sparta.

He was the son of Henry Richmond Droop (1832–1884), the mathematician, and Clara Baily ( 1841 – 7 September 1921). In 1916, he married Ita Bride Moloney; they had three children.

Works 

1908. "Two Cyrenaic Kylikes", Journal of Hellenic Studies 28:175–179.
1910. "The dates of the vases called 'Cyrenaic", Journal of Hellenic Studies 30:1–34.
1932. "Droop Cups and the Dating of Laconian Pottery", Journal of Hellenic Studies 52:303–304.

References

Sources
 
 
 

British archaeologists
Classical archaeologists
Academics of the University of Liverpool
1882 births
1963 deaths
20th-century archaeologists